The Copa Libertadores 1980 was the 21st edition of the Copa Libertadores, CONMEBOL's annual international club tournament. Nacional won the competition.

First stage

Group 1

Group 2

Group 3

Group 4

Group 5

Semifinals

Group A

Group B

Finals

|}

Champion

External links
 Sitio oficial de la CONMEBOL
 Libertadores 1980 at RSSSF.com

1
Copa Libertadores seasons